Events in the year 1992 in the Netherlands.

Incumbents
 Monarch: Beatrix
 Prime Minister: Ruud Lubbers

Events
9 April – The garden exhibition Floriade 1992 opens
13 April – The 1992 Roermond earthquake had a moment magnitude of 5.3 and a maximum Mercalli intensity of VII (Very strong). 
16 September – Pension de Vogel homeless hostel fire
4 October – El Al Flight 1862, a cargo aircraft, crashed in the Bijlmermeer neighbourhood
30 November – The Hoofddorp train accident

Births 

 
5 February – Nimir Abdel-Aziz, volleyball player 
19 February – Sandro Silva, DJ and record producer
20 March – Rochelle Perts, singer 
1 April – Sieneke, singer 
14 April – Josylvio, rapper
16 April – Ronnie Flex, hip hop performer and rapper
22 April – Dyro, DJ and EDM producer
9 May – Yesna Rijkhoff, track cyclist.
15 June – David van der Poel, road and cyclo-cross cyclist.
26 July – Mellony Geugjes, kickboxer and mixed martial artist
5 August – Estavana Polman, handball player.
7 August – Wout Weghorst, footballer 
26 July – Costello van Steenis, mixed martial artist 
13 August – Lois Abbingh, handball player.
26 August – Roy Kortsmit, footballer 
9 September – Madiea Ghafoor, athlete.
14 September – Kirsten Knip, volleyball player
30 September – Bodine Koehler, musician 
11 November – Iris Kroes, singer-songwriter and harpist 
12 December – Douwe Bob, singer-songwriter 
16 December - Chris Garia, sprinter and former baseball player

Full date missing
Camiel Fortgens, fashion designer

Deaths 

21 February – Kate ter Horst, the Angel of Arnhem (b. 1906)
8 March – Addeke Hendrik Boerma, civil servant (b. 1912)
15 March – Koos de Bruin, painter, draftsman, sculptor and graphic artist (b. 1941) 
18 March – Cornelis Bastiaan Vaandrager, writer and poet (b. 1935)
20 March – Han Schröder, architect and educator (b. 1918)
20 April – Marcel Albers, motor racing driver (b. 1967)
30 June – Jan van Heteren, water polo player (b. 1916).
18 July – Jan Pelleboer, meteorologist and weather presenter (b. 1924)
17 December – Rinus Terlouw, footballer (b. 1922).

References

 
1990s in the Netherlands
Years of the 20th century in the Netherlands
Netherlands
Netherlands